Pretty Dirty Secrets is an American mystery web series from the television series Pretty Little Liars. The web series is part of the Pretty Little Liars franchise and takes place between the events of the series' third season episodes, "The Lady Killer" and "This Is a Dark Ride". Set in the Rosewood Halloween Spooktacular Store, as the visitors of Rosewood prepared for Halloween.

Production 
The web series was written by Kyle Bown & Kim Turrisi and directed by Arthur Anderson. Kyle Bown, the assistant to Pretty Little Liars showrunner I. Marlene King, and Kim Turrisi, who is not part of the writing staff, were hired to write the web series by ABC Family, however the crew behind Pretty Little Liars was also used with the web series. The web series introduced Aeriél Miranda as Shana in the television series. None of the series regulars from Pretty Little Liars appears in the web series.

Release 
The episodes would become available each Tuesday on ABC Family's website from August 28, 2012, after the summer finale of the third season, as a way to tide viewers over until the Halloween special. The eighth and final episode was released on October 16, 2012.

Cast and characters 
Cast members from Pretty Little Liars appearing in the web series: 
 Aeriél Miranda as Shana Fring (5 episodes)
 Drew Van Acker as Jason DiLaurentis (Episode: "A Reunion")
 Vanessa Ray as CeCe Drake (Episode: "A Reunion")
 Brant Daugherty as Noel Kahn (Episode: "I'm a Free Man")
 Yani Gellman as Garrett Reynolds (Episode: "I'm a Free Man")
 Brendan Robinson as Lucas Gottesman (Episode: "Trade Off")

Episodes 
{| class="wikitable plainrowheaders" style="margin: auto; width: 100%"
|-
!!  style="background:#013220; color:#fff; text-align:center; width:5%;"|No.
!!  style="background:#013220; color:#fff; text-align:center; width:30%;"|Title
!!  style="background:#013220; color:#fff; text-align:center; width:20%;"|Directed by
!!  style="background:#013220; color:#fff; text-align:center; width:20%;"|Written by
!!  style="background:#013220; color:#fff; text-align:center; width:20%;"|Original release date

|}

References

External links 
 

2012 web series debuts
2012 web series endings
Mystery web series
Pretty Little Liars (franchise)
American drama web series
Interquel television series
Television series by Alloy Entertainment
Television series by Warner Horizon Television